Running Brave is a Canadian biographical sports drama film released in 1983 based on the story of Billy Mills, a member or the Oglala Sioux tribe located in South Dakota. Mills was born on the reservation, and later attended the University of Kansas  where he was recruited by the Olympic running team and won the gold medal in the 1964 Tokyo Olympics for the 10,000 meter race. In one of the great upsets in sports history, Mills sprinted from third place for the win. Mills is still the only American in history to win the Olympic 10,000 meter run. Robby Benson portrays Mills. Pat Hingle and a young Graham Greene also star.

Production
The film was directed by Donald Shebib, ultimately crediting himself with "D.S. Everett" due to an editing dispute. Billy Mills was actively involved in the making of this film.

Reception
The film is renowned for its accurate and sensitive depiction of Native culture.

Cast
Per Turner Classic Movies.

Robby Benson as Billy Mills
Pat Hingle as Coach Bill Easton
Claudia Cron as Pat
Graham Greene as Eddie
Wendell Smith as Chris Mitchell

References

External links
 
 
 

1983 films
Canadian drama films
English-language Canadian films
Films directed by Donald Shebib
Films shot in Edmonton
Running films
Films about the 1964 Summer Olympics
Films about Olympic track and field
Films set in 1964
1983 drama films
Biographical films about sportspeople
Cultural depictions of Canadian men
Cultural depictions of track and field athletes
1980s English-language films
1980s Canadian films